North Carolina v. Covington may refer to either of two United States Supreme Court cases:

 North Carolina v. Covington (2017)
 North Carolina v. Covington (2018)

See also
 List of United States Supreme Court cases
 Lists of United States Supreme Court cases by volume